Darb-e Babazi (also Romanized as Darb-e Bābāzī) is a village in Dalfard Rural District, Sarduiyeh District, Jiroft County, Kerman Province, Iran. At the 2006 census, its population was 40, in 9 families.

References 

Populated places in Jiroft County